Nagnath S. Inamdar (1923–2002) was an Indian novelist in the Marathi language whose career spanned almost five decades.

Career
Inamdar was born in a village in Satara district of Maharashtra, India. He rose from humble beginnings to establish himself as one of India's best novelists. He was a prominent figure in Marathi literature.

Works 
Inamdar wrote sixteen historical novels, the most prominent of which are

 Shahenshah - 1970
 Raau - 1972
 Jhunja
 Rajeshri
 Shikasta
 Mantravegala
 Jhep

He also wrote his autobiography spanning three volumes. In 2015, his novel Rau was adapted into an Indian historical epic film titled Bajirao Mastani, directed by Sanjay Leela Bhansali.

Death
Inamdar died on 16 October 2002 at his residence in Pune, aged 79. He is survived by his wife and a daughter.

Awards and recognition 
 1997 - presided over Marathi Sahitya Sammelan in Ahmednagar

References

Marathi-language writers
1923 births
2002 deaths
Presidents of the Akhil Bharatiya Marathi Sahitya Sammelan